Hold That Baby! is a 1949 comedy film starring The Bowery Boys. The film was released on June 26, 1949 by Monogram Pictures and is the fourteenth film in the series.

Plot
The boys are running a laundromat in the back room of Louie's Sweet Shop.  A woman, Laura Andrews, comes in and leaves her baby in one of the laundry baskets and the boys find him.  They discover that he is the heir to a fortune, and that his mother hid him so that her aunts couldn't steal the inheritance.  After discovering the baby is missing, the aunts have Laura committed to a sanatorium for supposedly being mentally ill.

Meanwhile a bunch of gangsters get wind of the situation and make a deal with the aunts to keep the baby away from the reading of the will.  Sach and Slip sneak into the sanatorium under the guise of committing Sach where they help Laura escape.  They make it to the reading of the will just in time and Laura and her son gain the inheritance and the aunts are arrested, along with the gangsters.

During the film Sach has a One Touch of Venus type longing for a store mannequin he calls Cynthia.

Cast

The Bowery Boys
 Leo Gorcey as Terrance Aloysius 'Slip' Mahoney
 Huntz Hall as Horace Debussy 'Sach' Jones
 William Benedict as Whitey
 David Gorcey as Chuck
 Bennie Bartlett as Butch

Remaining cast
 Gabriel Dell as Gabe Moreno
 Bernard Gorcey as Louie Dumbrowski
 Frankie Darro as Bananas
 Anabel Shaw as Laura Andrews
 John Kellogg as Cherry Nose Gray
 Ida Moore as Faith Andrews
 Edward Gargan as Officer Burton
 Cay Forrester as Sanitarium Nurse 
 Buddy Gorman as Paper Boy
 Frances Irvin as Cynthia

Home media
Warner Archives released the film on made-to-order DVD in the United States as part of "The Bowery Boys, Volume One" on November 23, 2012.

References

External links
 
 
 
 

1949 films
Bowery Boys films
1949 comedy films
Monogram Pictures films
American comedy films
American black-and-white films
Films directed by Reginald Le Borg
1940s English-language films
1940s American films